In the Best Interest of the Child is a 1990 American made-for-television drama film about child sexual abuse starring Meg Tilly, Ed Begley Jr., Michael O'Keefe and Michele Greene, directed by David Greene. It was originally broadcast on CBS on May 20, 1990.

Plot
Jennifer Colton (Tilly) is a divorced mother and architect who retains custody of her five-year-old daughter Mandy (Marta Woodward) while her ex-husband Walt (O'Keefe) is granted regular access. However, Jennifer becomes concerned by her daughter's restless sleeping and increasingly violent behaviors and is horrified to discover that Walt might be sexually abusing her. With the help of her attorney (cousin Howard Feldon (Begley), next-door neighbor and best friend Nora (Greene), as well as various doctors and therapists, Jennifer seeks to protect her daughter from Walt by having his access suspended.

Jennifer soon discovers that the law is not on her side when the court, in the absence of incontrovertible evidence, refuses to restrict Walt's unsupervised visitation rights. When Jennifer refuses to let Walt see Mandy, the judge finds her in contempt and places her in a county jail until she relents. Ultimately, Jennifer decides the only way to save Mandy from abuse is to "kidnap" Mandy. She is willing to go to prison so that Mandy can live in hiding with her relatives and away from her abusive father.

Cast
Meg Tilly as Jennifer Colton
Ed Begley Jr. as Howard Feldon
Michael O'Keefe as Walt Colton
Michele Greene as Nora
Marta Woodward as Mandy Colton
David Wohl as Judge Dunham
James Eckhouse as Chilton
Jim Byrnes as Kurt
Angela Bassett as Lori
Peter Hansen as Dr. Innes

Award nomination

References

External links

1990 films
1990 television films
1990 drama films
Films about child sexual abuse
Incest in film
Incest in television
Films directed by David Greene
CBS network films
American drama television films
1990s American films